Eckes is a surname.

List of people with the surname 

 Christian Eckes (born 2000), American professional stock car racing driver
 John N. Eckes (1844–1912), American Union Army soldier 
 Nazan Eckes (born 1976), German television presenter

Other 

 Eckes-Granini Group

See also 

 Eek
 Ecke

Surnames
Surnames of German origin